Gargari-ye Olya (also Romanized as  Gargarī-ye ‘Olyā and Gorgorī-ye ‘Olyā; also known as Gargari Bālāi, Gargīrī-ye Bālā, Gorgorī, and Gorgorī-ye Bālā) is a village in Asiab Rural District, in the Central District of Omidiyeh County, Khuzestan Province, Iran. At the 2006 census, its population was 346, in 71 families.

References 

Populated places in Omidiyeh County